William Nutbeam, of Ash-next-Sandwich, Kent, was an English politician.

Family
Nutbeam married, probably before 1398, Constance Ellis, daughter and coheiress of Thomas Ellis of Sandwich, Kent. They had one son.

Career
Nutbeam was a Justice of the Peace for Kent from 1407 to 1416 and appointed High Sheriff of Kent for 1411–12. He was elected Member of Parliament for Kent in 1411.

References

 

Year of birth missing
Year of death missing
People from Sandwich, Kent
English MPs 1411
High Sheriffs of Kent
People from Ash, Dover District